Galactic Chase is a fixed shooter for the Atari 8-bit family published by Spectrum Computers in 1981. It is a clone of Namco's Galaxian programmed by Anthony Weber.

Gameplay
Galactic Chase is a game in which invaders attack earth, and formations can break off to attack directly.

Reception
John J. Anderson reviewed the game for Computer Gaming World, and stated that:

References

External links
Review in Softline magazine
Electronic Games #2
Review in Byte
Review in Creative Computing
Review in Joystik

1981 video games
Atari 8-bit family games
Atari 8-bit family-only games
Fixed shooters
Video games developed in the United States
Video games set in outer space